Manipulator modificaputis is an extinct cockroach which lived during the Upper Cretaceous period. The holotype specimen is fossilized in a 100-million-year-old piece of Burmese amber, which was found in a quarry of volcanoclastic mudstone (a sedimentary rock) at Noije Bum in the Hukawng Valley in Myanmar. The insect has been described by Peter Vršanský, of the Geological Institute SAS of Bratislava, and by Günter Bechly, of the Staatliches Museum für Naturkunde in Stuttgart.

The cockroach was found to have an elongated neck, a freely rotating head and unexpectedly long legs, which are indicative of a predatory lifestyle. However, in 2022, it is considered that Manipulator tend to live around and feed on flowers. In addition, this insect have some characters superficially look like similar to mantises, however differ from other many characters.

The authors erected a new family, "Manipulatoridae," after examining the specimen on the basis of "the unique habitus with numerous autapomorphies along with several plesiomorphies." Other specimens including that of a juvenile were discovered from the Myanmar amber mines, and described in 2022.

This species was found along with dozens of other extinct species of insects fully preserved in amber, making Noije Bum in the Hukawng Valley region one of the most important regions for amber fossils containing fully preserved insects. Dozens of other preserved insects were found in the area in Noije Bum, where the fossilized remains of the extinct species were also found.

This species belonged to the invertebrate fauna of the ancient amber forest of the Myanmar region.

It was the only member of the family Manipulatoridae until 2022, when the related genus Manipulatoides was described from the same deposit.

References

Late Cretaceous insects
Cockroach genera
Prehistoric insect genera

Fossil taxa described in 2015
Insects described in 2015
Burmese amber
Fossils of Myanmar